The 1987 South Pacific Games, held from 8–20 December 1987 at Nouméa in New Caledonia, was the eight edition of the South Pacific Games. Political events of the time affected the Games in 1987 and the number of competitors were down. Fiji had two military coups in 1987, and within New Caledonia itself, the Games became a focus of protest in the Kanak independence struggle. The French territories of New Caledonia and French Polynesia had the largest teams and dominated the medal count, with Papua New Guinea finishing third ahead of a depleted Fijian team.

Participating countries
Twelve Pacific nations participated in the Games:

Sports
There were 18 sports contested at the 1987 South Pacific Games:

Note: A number in parentheses indicates how many medal events were contested in that sport (where known).

Final medal table
Medals were awarded in a total of 164 events:

See also
Athletics at the 1987 South Pacific Games
Football at the 1987 South Pacific Games

Notes
  A total of 1,650 athletes from 12 Pacific nations and territories took part in the Games. The Solomon Islands and Western Samoa did not attend.

 The results published on the OSIC (Oceania Sport Information Centre) website listed 18 sports. Islands Business reported that there was no netball at the 1987 Games:

 Postage stamps depicting athletics, rugby and golf were issued by New Caledonia for the 1987 South Pacific Games.

 Football finals: New Caledonia 1-0 Tahiti in the gold medal match. Papua New Guinea 3-1 Vanuatu in the bronze medal match.

 Rugby: New Caledonia won the rugby 15s gold medal.

 The South Pacific Games Council announced in 1978 that squash would be included in the Games, and it was played in 1979, 1983, 1987, and 1991.

References

Sources

Pacific Games by year
International sports competitions hosted by New Caledonia
Sport in New Caledonia
Pacific Games
P
 
1987 in New Caledonia
Pacific